Gurbachan Singh was an Indian long-distance runner. He competed in the men's 5000 metres at the 1928 Summer Olympics.

References

Year of birth missing
Year of death missing
Athletes (track and field) at the 1928 Summer Olympics
Indian male long-distance runners
Olympic athletes of India
Place of birth missing